The  is a correctional facility in Katsushika, Tokyo. The prison, which is operated by the Ministry of Justice, is one of seven detention centres that carry out executions in Japan. It is used to detain people awaiting trial, convicted felons and those sentenced to death. In April 2019, the Special Security Response Team, a tactical response unit, was established at the TDH.

Execution chamber

One of Japan's seven execution chambers is in this facility. All executions in Japan are carried out by hanging. The execution chamber in Tokyo has a trap door, which is operated by one of the three buttons in the next-door room, which are simultaneously pressed by three prison staff members so that none of them will know who activated the drop. 

Before entering the execution chamber, the condemned person passes a Buddhist statue of Kannon (観音), a bodhisattva associated with compassion. The execution chamber has two sections, with both of them together no larger than a 15-tatami mat room. When the execution happens, the body drops into a room below the execution chamber; it is in this room where death is confirmed.

Notable prisoners
 Carlos Ghosn
Kiyoshi Miki
 Shoko Asahara (hanged 6 July 2018)
 Richard Sorge
 Prime Minister Kakuei Tanaka
Norio Nagayama (hanged 1 August 1997)
Tsutomu Miyazaki (hanged on 17 June 2008)
Masahiro Kanagawa (hanged 21 February 2013)
Seiichi Endo (hanged 6 July 2018)
Yukio Seki (hanged 26 November 1993)
Teruhiko Seki (hanged 19 December 2017)
Hideki Kanda (hanged 1 August 1997)
Toru Toyoda (hanged 26 July 2018)
Kenichi Hirose (hanged 26 July 2018)
Seiha Fujima (hanged 7 December 2007)
Mitsuo Yabe (hanged 30 September 1987)
Koichi Shoji (hanged 2 August 2019)
Yoshio Iwamoto (hanged 27 August 2007)
Tomohiro Katō (hanged 26 July 2022)

References

External links

 法務省矯正局 
 東京拘置所 

Buildings and structures in Tokyo
Prisons in Japan
Execution sites in Japan
Katsushika
1879 establishments in Japan